These are the partial results of the athletics competition at the 1983 Mediterranean Games taking place between 12 and 16 September 1983 in Casablanca, Morocco.

Men's results

100 meters

Heats – 12 SeptemberWind:Heat 1: +3.6 m/s, Heat 2: +0.5 m/s

Final – 12 SeptemberWind: +0.1 m/s

200 meters
Heats – 13 SeptemberWind: Heat 1: +1.0 m/s, Heat 2: +0.6 m/s

Final – 15 SeptemberWind: +3.2 m/s

400 meters
Heats – 12 September

Final – 13 September

800 meters
Heats – 15 September

Final – 16 September

1500 meters
12 September

5000 meters
16 September

10,000 meters
12 September

Marathon
16 September

110 meters hurdles
16 SeptemberWind: +5.2 m/s

400 meters hurdles
Heats – 12 September

Final – 12 September

3000 meters steeplechase
15 September

4 x 100 meters relay
16 September

4 x 400 meters relay
16 September

20 kilometers walk

High jump
16 September

Pole vault
15 September

Long jump
15 September

Triple jump
13 September

Shot put

Discus throw
15 September

Hammer throw
13 September

Javelin throw

Decathlon
12–13 September

Women's results

100 meters
Wind: +0.7 m/s

200 meters
Wind: +2.8 m/s

400 meters
Heats

Final

800 meters
Heats – 13 September

Final – 13 September

1500 meters
16 September

3000 meters
13 September

100 meters hurdles
Wind: +0.5 m/s

400 meters hurdles
12 September

4 x 100 meters relay
16 September

4 x 400 meters relay
16 September

High jump
13 September

Long jump
12 September

Shot put

Discus throw

Javelin throw

Heptathlon
15–16 September

References

Mediterranean Games
1983